Petersville is a census-designated place (CDP) in Matanuska-Susitna Borough, Alaska, United States. It is part of the Anchorage Metropolitan Area. The population was 27 at the 2020 census.

Geography
Petersville is located in the northwest part of Matanuska-Susitna Borough at  (62.376890, -150.746952). It is bordered to the east by the Trapper Creek CDP. The CDP is bordered to the north by Denali National Park.

The CDP is bordered to the west by the Kahiltna River, fed by the Kahiltna Glacier on the south side of Denali.

Climate 

Demographics

Petersville first appeared on the 2000 U.S. Census as a census-designated place (CDP).

As of the census of 2000, there were 27 people, 17 households, and 7 families residing in the CDP. The population density was 0.1 people per square mile (0.0/km2). There were 189 housing units at an average density of 0.5/sq mi (0.2/km2). The racial makeup of the CDP was 88.89% White, 7.41% Native American and 3.70% Pacific Islander.

There were 17 households, out of which 5.9% had children under the age of 18 living with them, 29.4% were married couples living together, and 58.8% were non-families. 58.8% of all households were made up of individuals, and 11.8% had someone living alone who was 65 years of age or older. The average household size was 1.59 and the average family size was 2.00.

In the CDP, the population was spread out, with 3.7% under the age of 18, 18.5% from 25 to 44, 63.0% from 45 to 64, and 14.8% who were 65 years of age or older. The median age was 52 years. For every 100 females, there were 200.0 males. For every 100 females age 18 and over, there were 225.0 males.

The median income for a household in the CDP was $43,750, and the median income for a family was $0. Males had a median income of $0 versus $0 for females. The per capita income for the CDP was $43,200. There were no families and none of the population living below the poverty line, including no under eighteens and none of those over 64.

See also
 Yentna-Cache Creek mining district

References

External links
 Driveguide to the Petersville Road/South Denali

Anchorage metropolitan area
Census-designated places in Alaska
Census-designated places in Matanuska-Susitna Borough, Alaska
Mining communities in Alaska